Karina Adsbøl (born 26 November 1976 in Kolding) is a Danish politician, who was a member of the Folketing for the Danish People's Party, until 2022, and since then for the Denmark Democrats. She was elected into parliament at the 2011 Danish general election.

Background
Adsbøl is a certified social and health care worker. She has worked as a home nurse in Fredericia Municipality, and as a secretary before being elected into parliament. She is married and has three children.

Political career
Adsbøl was first elected into parliament at the 2011 Danish general election, where she received 1,748 personal votes. She was reelected in 2015 with 3,101 votes and in 2019 with 1,526 votes.

External links

References 

Living people
1976 births
People from Kolding
21st-century Danish women politicians
Women members of the Folketing
Danish People's Party politicians
Members of the Folketing 2011–2015
Members of the Folketing 2015–2019
Members of the Folketing 2019–2022
Members of the Folketing 2022–2026
Denmark Democrats politicians